The Idaho Falls School District #91 is a public school district in the U.S. state of Idaho. District #91 serves about 10,742 students of Idaho Falls, Idaho, and parts of rural Bonneville County in 18 schools, making it the seventh-largest by enrollment in the state. The district has: 12 elementary schools serving students in K-6, two middle schools serving students in grades 7-8, and  two high schools serving students in grades 9-12,  along  with an alternative high school and Compass Academy, a magnet high school through the New Tech Network.

Schools

High schools
 Idaho Falls High School

 Skyline High School

Magnet high schools
 Compass Academy

Alternative High Schools
 Emerson Alternative High School

Middle schools
Eagle Rock Middle School
Feeder Schools:
• A.H. Bush Elementary School
• Ethel Boyes Elementary School
• Fox Hollow Elementary School
• Hawthorne Elementary School
• Temple View Elementary School
• Westside Elementary School

Taylorview Middle School
Feeder Schools:
• Dora Erickson Elementary School
• Edgemont Elementary School
• Hawthorne Elementary School
• Linden Park Elementary School
• Longfellow Elementary School
• Sunnyside Elementary School
• Theresa Bunker Elementary School

Elementary schools
 A.H. Bush Elementary School 
 Dora Erickson Elementary School 
 Edgemont Elementary School 
 Ethel Boyes Elementary School 
 Fox Hollow Elementary School
 Hawthorne Elementary School 
 Linden Park Elementary School 
 Longfellow Elementary School 
 Sunnyside Elementary School 
 Temple View Elementary School 
 Theresa Bunker Elementary School
 Westside Elementary School

Each fall, the varsity football teams of Idaho Falls and Skyline High Schools compete in a rival football game called the Emotion Bowl, at Idaho Falls' Ravsten Stadium, which is shared by the two schools. The winning team and its fans traditionally paint the goalposts of the stadium in their school colors (orange for Idaho Falls High School, and blue for Skyline High School) after each Emotion Bowl.

References

External links

School districts in Idaho
Idaho Falls, Idaho
School districts established in 1947
1947 establishments in Idaho